Marianthus is a genus of flowering plants within the family Pittosporaceae.

The genus was originally established in 1837 by Endlicher. It was resurrected from synonymy in 2004 by Lindy Cayzer and Mike Crisp.

The species, which are all endemic to Australia, include:

Marianthus aquilonaris N.Gibson & Wege 
Marianthus angustifolius Putt.  
Marianthus bicolor (Putt.) F. Muell. - Painted Marianthus 
Marianthus bignoniaceus F.Muell.  - Orange Bell-climber  
Marianthus candidus Hügel  - White Marianthus 	
Marianthus coelestis Putt.  	
Marianthus coeruleopunctatus Klotzsch - Blue-spotted Marianthus 
Marianthus cuneatus Müll.Berol.  
Marianthus drummondianus (Putt.) Benth.   
Marianthus dryandra L.W.Cayzer & Crisp  
Marianthus erubescens Putt.  
Marianthus granulatus (Turcz.) Benth.  
Marianthus microphyllus (Turcz.) Benth.   
Marianthus mollis (E.M. Benn.) L.W. Cayzer & Crisp - Hairy-fruited Billardiera   
Marianthus paralius L.W.Cayzer & Crisp   
Marianthus ringens (J. Drumm. ex Harv.) F. Muell.  
Marianthus sylvaticus L.W.Cayzer & Crisp  
Marianthus tenuis Benth.

References

Apiales of Australia
Pittosporaceae
Apiales genera